Aguas Calientes ("hot waters" in Spanish) is the name of a river in Carabobo state.

Source
The source is associated with the hot springs of Las Trincheras near Valencia.

Visit of Humboldt
The springs were visited in 1800 by Alexander von Humboldt, who measured the temperature. He then followed the river down to the Caribbean coast.
Humboldt published a scientific description of the springs on his return to Europe. 
He concluded that they obtained their heat from very deep groundwater circulation.

Railway
The Puerto Cabello and Valencia railway was built in the 1880s following the course of the valley for a considerable part of its route.
It closed in the 1950s, but a new railway is under construction.

Mouth
The river flows into the Caribbean west of Puerto Cabello.

References
 

Rivers of Carabobo State